Hygrophoropsis mangenotii is an edible gilled mushroom of the genus Hygrophoropsis native to the Ivory Coast. It was described in 1954 by Marcel Locquin.

References

External links

Hygrophoropsidaceae
Edible fungi
Fungi of Africa
Fungi described in 1954
Taxa named by Marcel Locquin